Zenos Ramsey Miller (13 September 1895 – 22 July 1922) was an American pursuit pilot and a flying ace in World War I.

Biography
Born in Pao Ting Fu, China, Miller joined the Air Service, United States Army in 1917 during World War I. After pilot training in the United States, Lieutenant Miller was assigned to the 27th Aero Squadron, 1st Pursuit Group, First Army Air Service on 24 November 1917. Scoring his first two victories on the afternoon and evening of 16 July 1918, Miller shot down an enemy balloon over Gland and later forced down a second balloon while dogfighting three Fokkers. He scored a third victory shooting down a Fokker D.VII on 19 July.

During his tour of duty, he had the bad luck to decapitate a French worker who had been cutting the grass at Toul (Gengault Aerodrome) when he flew in to land after one patrol, and after another he accidentally set fire to his own aircraft which was destroyed along with the canvas hangar it was in.

On 20 July 1918, he took off on a combat patrol he shot down two enemy aircraft, becoming his total to five, and becoming an air ace. However, the flight ran into severe weather which caused three SPAD S.XIIIs to crash inside enemy territory. Two of the pilots were killed; Lt. Miller survived but was made a Prisoner of War (POW). Upon returning from the POW camp his report of the last flight was confirmed.

After the war he was demobilized he entered Princeton University and became a doctor. In 1921, a friend of his, Dr. Clarence Gamble, had purchased an old Savoia-Marchetti plane and was attempting to make a transcontinental flight from Boston to Pasadena, California. On 22 July 1922, shortly before the flight, Miller, his brother Ralph, and Gamble were flying over Boston "for a last look at the scene of their medical studies and were returning to the filed preparatory to setting out on the first leg of their journey" when the aircraft went into a spin and crashed into a swamp near Framingham, Massachusetts, killing Miller.

See also

 List of World War I flying aces from the United States

References

1895 births
1922 deaths
American World War I flying aces
United States Army officers
Princeton University alumni
Aviators killed in aviation accidents or incidents in the United States
Accidental deaths in Massachusetts